Zinc finger protein 716 is a protein that in humans is encoded by the ZNF716 gene.

References

Further reading 

Human proteins